Zinc finger protein 107 is a protein that in humans is encoded by the ZNF107 gene.

Function

This gene encodes a protein containing multiple C2H2-type zinc finger regions. Proteins containing zinc fingers may act as transcriptional regulators, but may also have other cellular functions. Alternative splicing results in multiple transcript variants.

References

Further reading